Hirtaeschopalaea borneensis is a species of beetle in the family Cerambycidae. It was described by Stephan von Breuning in 1963. It is known from Borneo.

References

Lamiinae
Beetles described in 1963